Schitu Duca is a commune in Iași County, Western Moldavia, Romania, part of the Iași metropolitan area. It is composed of eight villages: Blaga, Dumitreștii Gălății, Pocreaca, Poiana, Poieni, Satu Nou, Schitu Duca and Slobozia.

References

Communes in Iași County
Localities in Western Moldavia